Finance Federation is the name of:

 CFDT Finance Federation, a trade union in France
 Finance Federation (Denmark), a trade union
 Finance Federation (France), a trade union affiliated to the CGT

See also
 FO Finances, a French trade union